Martin Farineaux (born 13 August 1981) is a French paracanoeist who has competed since the late 2000s. He won a silver medal in the K-1 200 m LTA event at the 2010 ICF Canoe Sprint World Championships in Poznań.

References

External links 
 
 

1981 births
Living people
French male canoeists
Paracanoeists of France
LTA classification paracanoeists
ICF Canoe Sprint World Championships medalists in paracanoe